Georg Schenk von Limpurg (1470–1522) was the Prince-Bishop of Bamberg from 1505 to 1522.

Biography

Georg Schenk von Limpurg was born in Obersontheim in 1470.

He was elected Prince-Bishop of Bamberg on 13 February 1505, with Pope Julius II confirming his appointment on 18 April 1505.  He was consecrated as a bishop by Kaspar Preiel, auxiliary bishop of Bamberg, on 20 October 1505.

In 1507, he appointed Johann of Schwarzenberg to reform the law of Bamberg; Johann of Schwarzenberg drafted the Halsgerichtsordnung (Procedure for the judgment of capital crimes) of Bamberg (also known as the Bambergensis), which would later form the basis of the Constitutio Criminalis Carolina (1530–32).

Schenk von Limpurg was a trusted adviser of Maximilian I, Holy Roman Emperor, particularly at the 1518 Imperial Diet held in Augsburg, where the major topic of discussion was Martin Luther.

He died in Altenburg, Bamberg, on 31 May 1522.  He is buried in Bamberg Cathedral, with a funerary monument by Loy Hering.

Cultural Depictions

Georg Schenk von Limpurg is the Bishop of Bamberg who was a character in Johann Wolfgang von Goethe's play Götz von Berlichingen (1773).

References

1470 births
1522 deaths
Prince-Bishops of Bamberg